Ken or Kenneth Jones may refer to:

Sports 
 Ken Jones (rugby union, born 1921) (1921–2006), Welsh athlete and international rugby union footballer 1950s
 Ken Jones (rugby union, born 1941) (1941–2022), Wales international rugby union footballer who played in the 1960s
 Ken Jones (footballer, born 1936) (1936–2013), Welsh international football player (Cardiff City, Scunthorpe, Charlton Athletic)
 Ken Jones (English footballer, born 1936), English footballer for Sunderland
 Ken Jones (footballer, born 1937), Welsh former footballer
 Ken Jones (footballer, born 1941), English football player (Southend United, Millwall, Colchester United)
 Ken Jones (footballer, born 1944) (1944–2012), English football player (Bradford PA, Southampton, Cardiff City)
 Ken Jones (American football) (born 1952), National Football League offensive lineman
 Ken Jones (baseball) (1903–1991), Major League Baseball pitcher
 Kenny Jones (basketball) (born 1984), American basketball player
 Ken Jones (Australian footballer) (born 1934), Australian rules footballer
 Kenwyne Jones (born 1984), Trinidadian football player

Music 
 Ken Jones (music) (1927–1988), English film and television composer
 Kenney Jones (born 1948), English rock drummer
 Kenneth Jones (songwriter) (1952–1969), songwriter, son of Helen Carter, nephew of Johnny Cash
 Kennedy Jones (musician) (1900–1990), guitarist and music writer
 Kenneth V. Jones (1924–2020), British film composer

Media 
 Ken Jones (news reporter) (1938–1993), American television news reporter, actor, publisher
 Kennedy Jones (journalist) (1865–1921), British journalist, editor, newspaper manager, and Member of Parliament

Others 
 Kenneth Arthur Newton Jones (1924–1964), former Minister of Communications and Works of Jamaica
 Ken Jones (actor) (1930–2014), English actor
 Ken Jones (Buddhist) (1930–2015), Welsh Buddhist, author, poet, and activist
 Ken Jones (politician) (born 1939), Canadian politician
 Ken Jones (activist) (1950–2021), American LGBT rights activist
 Ken Jones (police officer), former Deputy Commissioner of Victoria Police and former President of ACPO
 Kenneth Norman Jones (born 1924), Australian public servant